The Nightmare is a 2015 German drama and psychological horror film directed by . The title and themes are inspired by the otherwise unrelated painting The Nightmare by Swiss painter Henry Fuseli. Rock musician Kim Gordon (Sonic Youth) has a cameo as an English poetry teacher.

Plot 
The film opens with a warning about its intense usage of strobe lights and disorienting sound profiles.

During a hot summer in Berlin the 17-year old Tina and her friends travel to a late-evening party at a public swimming pool. One of the girls tells Tina about a misshapen embryo shown to students during biology class. She takes a photograph of Tina with her smartphone to morph her into the picture. Later someone else also shows her someone getting run over by a car in a video on his smartphone. During the party Tina notices a bizarre creature in the forest and is so frightened that she wants to go home. Once back at the car she notices her necklace is missing and spots pieces of it on the street. As she gets out the car and cobbles it back together a car passes by and smacks her down.

A few moments later Tina wakes up, apparently not hurt fatally. A feeling of déjà-vu strikes her, as scenes similar to what happened before take place again, including her getting in the car and noticing her necklace is gone.

At home Tina notices the strange creature from before raiding the kitchen fridge. She warns her parents and later security personnel to check whether there was an intruder in the home, but none of them find any evidence and don't seem to be able to see the creature. Tina talks with her therapist, and he advises her to approach and touch the creature. She follows his advice and discovers it seems to be real. Not only that, but they seem to have a strange physical sensory connection: whenever it hurts itself - or is hurt by others - Tina also experiences pain.

Tina starts to like the creature and brings food to her room to feed it. At a certain moment her parents hear the creature's noise, open her bedroom door and to their horror notice she is sleeping next to it on her bed. They take her away and try to catch it with help from police officers and animal control specialists. As the creature is tranquilized, Tina also collapses in a coma. The creature is brought to a hospital for further investigation.

Tina wakes up and confronts her parents about the creature, but they have no idea what she is talking about. Back in school Tina is mocked and alienated by her former friends who all heard what happened and assume she is losing her mind. Despite the fact that they planned to throw a birthday party for her, she is not invited by them and her parents want to keep her at home, since her mental condition is so bad. She celebrates her 18th birthday at home with her parents but discovers they plan to send her to a mental hospital. Angry, she sneaks out that night, steals her parents' car, saves the creature from the hospital, and goes to the party.

At the party she meets her friends and the boy she had an eye on the entire time. They kiss for the first time, but then other people notice the creature. As others try to harm it she goes over and defends him, but her parents - who also arrived at the scene - throw a stone sculpture at it.

The final scene shows Tina waking up in the back of the moving car, while the creature is behind the wheel. She feels comforted and together they drive away.

Cast 
  - Tina
  - Barbara
 Wilson Gonzalez Ochsenknecht - Adam 
 Arnd Klawitter - Tina's father
 Julika Jenkins - Tina's mother
  - Rashid
  - police officer Schonrath
 Kim Gordon - English teacher

Awards 
The picture won the Youth Jury Prize and Oecumenical Jury Prize at the Max Ophüls Prize Film Festival (2016) and the award for Best Foreign Picture at the 12th Fantaspoa Festival in Brazil, in 2016.

Recognition 
Jay Bauman of the website RedLetterMedia liked the film on his Twitter account and named it "a really good mood piece. Loved the driving soundtrack and uneasy, wide angle lens camera work."

References

External links 

 Hollywood Reporter review
 Article about the film's themes

2015 horror films
2010s psychological drama films
German drama films
German horror films
German fantasy films
German teen films
German teen drama films
German teen horror films
German teen fantasy films
2015 films
Films set in Berlin
2010s teen fantasy films
2010s teen horror films
Films about mental health
Films about psychiatry
Films about nightmares
Fictional humanoids
2010s monster movies
2010s psychological horror films
2010s teen drama films
Films directed by Achim Bornhak
2015 drama films
2010s German films
2010s German-language films